The 1988–89 Michigan Wolverines men's basketball team represented the University of Michigan in intercollegiate college basketball during the 1988–89 season. The head coach was Bill Frieder, who was dismissed before the 1989 NCAA Division I men's basketball tournament and replaced by assistant Steve Fisher. They played their home games at Crisler Arena in Ann Arbor, Michigan as members of the Big Ten Conference. They finished the season 30–7, 12–6 in Big Ten play to finish in third place. The Wolverines received an at-large bid to the NCAA tournament as the No. 3 seed in the Southeast region. They defeated Xavier and South Alabama to advance to the Sweet Sixteen. In the Sweet Sixteen, they defeated No. 5-ranked North Carolina and Virginia to advance to the Final Four. In the Final Four, they defeated fellow Big Ten member and No. 3-ranked Illinois to advance to the National Championship game. There they defeated No. 11 Seton Hall in overtime to win the school's first and, to date, only National Championship.

Previous season 
The Wolverines finished the 1987–88 season 26–8, 13–5 in Big Ten play to finish in second place. They received an at-large bid to the NCAA tournament as a No. 3 seed. There they defeated Boise State and Florida to advance to the Sweet Sixteen before losing to North Carolina.

Season summary 
The team was ranked all eighteen weeks of the season in the Associated Press Top Twenty Poll where it began the season at number three, ended at number ten and peaked at number two. and it also ended the season ranked tenth in the final UPI Coaches' Poll.

The team repeated as the national statistical champion in team field goal percentage (56.6%, 1325 of 2341).  During the season the team set numerous national and conference records. Glen Rice set the current Big Ten single-game three-point field goals percentage record against Wisconsin on February 25, 1989 (100% most made, 7 of 7). He also broke Mike McGee's Big Ten career points record with 2442, but that was eclipsed in 1993, although it remains the school record.  The team set the following current Big Ten records: single-season points (3393), single-season field goals made (1325), single-season field goals attempted (2341), single-season field goal percentage (.566), single-season field goals percentage (conference games only, .561, 606 of 1,080), and single-season assists (745).  Rice and Mark Hughes served as team co-captains and Rice earned team MVP. Rice was also recognized as a consensus All-American.  Dave Balza was student manager.

Rice's 949 points established the current school single-season record, surpassing Cazzie Russell's 1966 record of 800. He also set the current school single-season field goals record of 363, surpassing Mike McGee. He set the current single-season three-point field goal percentage record of 51.56%, surpassing Gary Grant's previous season mark of 48.53%. Additionally, he set the school record for career and single-season three-point shots made with 135 and 99, respectively, that would last for ten years and eight years, respectively.  He also set the current single-game field goal percentage record of 100% (7-for-7) against Wisconsin on February 25, 1989, surpassing Garde Thompson's 8-for-9 1986 performance. Loy Vaught also broke the Michigan single field goal percentage record of 62.18% that he set the prior year by reaching a 66.12%, which would stand as the record until 1995. For the third year in a row, the team established a new Michigan single-season scoring record with 3393 points. For the last of five consecutive seasons, the team set the school record for single-season field goal percentage on with a 56.6% (1325-for-2341) performance. This continues to be the school record. The team also set the current school single-season three-point field goal percentage record of 46.8%  (196-for-419), surpassing the 1987 record, while setting a school record for three-point field goals made of 196 that would last until 1997.  The team set the current school single-season free throws made record of 547, which surpassed the 1977 mark of 510.> For the third of three consecutive seasons, the team set the school single-season total assist record with a total of 745, surpassing the prior total of 694 and establishing the current record.  Rice ended his career with 134 games played, which surpassed Gary Grant's 1988 school record of 129 games. Vaught would surpass this record the following year.

The team earned numerous conference statistical championships. Rice won the scoring average championship for conference games only with a 24.8 average as well as the three-point shot championship with 55 in his conference games.  Vaught won the field goal percentage title with a 67.7% mark.  Terry Mills won the blocked shots championship with a 1.22 average in conference games.  In addition, the team won scoring offense (87.8), scoring margin (10.3), field goal percentage (56.1%) and three-point field goals made (103).
 
During the six-game championship tournament run, Rice set the current NCAA Division I men's basketball tournament single-tournament records for points (184), field goals made (75), and three-point field goals made (27) as well as the career record for three-point field goal percentage (minimum 30 made, 56.5%, 35–62). In addition, Rumeal Robinson set the current championship game assists record (11 on April 3, 1989, vs. Seton Hall in overtime) as well as the current final four two-game assist record of 23.  The team also set the final four two-game assist record of 42, which would be broken the following year.

In the 64-team NCAA Division I men's basketball tournament, number three seeded Michigan won the tournament by defeating the fourteen-seeded Xavier Musketeers 92–87, the six-seeded  91–82, the two-seeded North Carolina, who had ousted them the prior two years, 92–87, the five-seeded Virginia 102–65, the one-seeded Illinois 83–81 and three-seeded Seton Hall 80–79 in overtime. Against North Carolina, the team set the school record of 13 three-point field goals made, which would last until February 22, 1998.

They became the first team in school history to win 30 games.  They held the wins record until the 2018 team won 32 games making it to the Final Four.  The team continues to rank second in NCAA history in single-season team field goal percentage: 56.6% (1325 of 2341).

Roster

Schedule and results

|-
!colspan=9 style=|Non-conference regular season

|-
!colspan=9 style=|Big Ten regular season

|-
!colspan=9 style=|NCAA tournament

Rankings

Statistics
The team posted the following statistics:

Awards and honors
 Glen Rice, NCAA Men's MOP Award

Team players drafted into the NBA
Five players from this team were selected in the NBA draft.

References

Michigan
Michigan Wolverines men's basketball seasons
NCAA Division I men's basketball tournament championship seasons
NCAA Division I men's basketball tournament Final Four seasons
Michigan
Michigan Wolve
Michigan Wolve